Galnon is a drug which acts as a selective, non-peptide agonist at the galanin receptors GALR. It has anticonvulsant, anxiolytic, anorectic and amnestic effects in animal studies.

References

Neuropeptides
Lactams